Yamunanagar Assembly constituency is one of the 90 assembly seats of Haryana, India. It is a part of Yamunanagar district and includes Yamunanagar city. It comes under Ambala (Lok Sabha constituency) for national elections.

Members of Legislative Assembly
 2009: Dilbagh Singh, Indian National Lok Dal
 2014: Ghanshyam Dass, Bharatiya Janata Party
 2019: Ghanshyam Dass, Bharatiya Janata Party

Election results

2019

2014

References

Yamunanagar district
Assembly constituencies of Haryana